Audrey Ann Fagan  (23 June 1962 – 20 April 2007) was an Australian police officer, who, between 2005 and 2007, held the rank of Assistant Commissioner and served as the Chief Police Officer of Australian Capital Territory (ACT) Policing, which includes community policing responsibilities for Canberra and other parts of the ACT. Fagan was awarded the Australian Police Medal in 2004 and died in office, having committed suicide by hanging while on vacation.

Early years and background
Fagan was born in Ireland in 1962. Fagan and her parents, Arthur and Jenny, emigrated to South Australia in 1971, when Fagan was nine. She joined the Australian Federal Police (AFP) in 1981, at the age of 18.

Death
On 20 April 2007, Fagan committed suicide while holidaying on Queensland's Hayman Island. She was found hanged. The Queensland Police investigated her death and concluded there were no suspicious circumstances.

Assistant Commissioner Fagan was under scrutiny over the treatment of detainees in Canberra police cells after the ACT Ombudsman revealed details in February of a joint review to examine procedures in Canberra's watch house. It followed complaints made to the Ombudsman relating to the treatment of intoxicated detainees and those with a disability, failure to provide timely medical treatment and theft of property.

Two weeks before her death, Jack Waterford, the editor-at-large of The Canberra Times, wrote an editorial highly critical of the management of the AFP at that time, in which he opined that the ACT was "receiving a second-rate service at Rolls-Royce cost" and suggested that ACT Policing "was a complacent and unaccountable organisation of no great competence which is wide open to and may have already been percolated by corruption", allegations which were picked up by other ACT media outlets, including the ABC. AFP Commissioner Mick Keelty confirmed that Assistant Commissioner Fagan had felt under pressure as a result of the latest media attention and had sought professional support.

Fagan is survived by her second husband Chris Rowell, daughter Clair from her previous marriage to Andrew Phillips, and two step-children, Glen Rowell and Carly.

A funeral with full police honours was held at St. Christopher's Cathedral, Manuka on 27 April 2007, after which Fagan was interred at a private family ceremony.

References

External links
 

1962 births
2007 deaths
Australian Federal Police
Chief Police Officers of ACT Policing
Irish emigrants to Australia
People from the Australian Capital Territory
Suicides by hanging in Australia
Suicides in Queensland
Recipients of the Australian Police Medal
2007 suicides